François Gamache is a Canadian cinematographer. He is most noted for his work on the film The Vinland Club (Le Club Vinland), for which he received a Prix Iris nomination for Best Cinematography at the 23rd Quebec Cinema Awards in 2021.

References

External links

Canadian cinematographers
French Quebecers
Living people
Year of birth missing (living people)